Scaredy Cats is a fantasy comedy children's streaming television series created by Anna McRoberts. The series stars Sophia Reid-Gantzert, Daphne Hoskins, and Ava Augustin as Willa Ward, Scout, and Lucy, 12-year-old girls who learn about witchcraft. Other main cast members include Carolyn Taylor, Lauren McGibbon, Zibby Allen, Rhys Slack, Fred Ewanuick, April Amber Telek, Bill Reiter, and Michael Teigen. Released on October 1, 2021, on Netflix, the series has received generally positive responses.

Synopsis
On her 12th birthday, Willa Ward inherits an amulet from her mother. She and her friends Scout and Lucy soon learn that it is magical and that Willa's mother is a witch. Two bad witches Wilma and Wanda, who have been looking for the amulet for over a decade, sense it and come after Willa, seeking to create evil things. Rest of the series is all about Willa's journey to learn magic and fight the evil witches with the help of her two friends and a magic potion that turns them into cats.

Cast

Main
Sophia Reid-Gantzert as Willa Ward
Daphne Hoskins as Lucy
Ava Augustin as Scout
Carolyn Taylor as Wanda
Lauren McGibbon as Wilma
Zibby Allen as Ms. Juniper
Rhys Slack as Wyatt 
April Amber Telek as Sneak
Michael Teigen as Neil Ward
Fred Ewanuick as Sticky Paws Fink
Bill Reiter

Recurring and guest
Viola Abley as Blaine
Ryan Beil as Claw
Zahf Paroo as Principal McKay
Rosemary Dunsmore as Winifred
Laura Harris as Willow Ward
Nathan Clark as Frank
Larke Miller as Mrs. Winklepinkle
Azriel Dalman as Sawyer

Production and release
On September 7, 2021, Netflix announced Scaredy Cats as part of its "Netflix and Chills" lineup. The show is created by Anna McRoberts and Robert Vince, and was released on October 1, 2021, with episodes approximately 24–46 minutes long.

Episodes

Reception
Reception towards the series has generally been positive. From Decider, Joel Keller praised the performances, particularly that of Reid-Gantzert and Teigen. He also commended the special effects, commenting that they are "done with care and precision". Overall, he called it a "goofy show that's definitely kid oriented. But the story is interesting enough, and the VFX are good enough, that it should keep parents engaged while their kids watch." Kanika Kumar of The Cinemaholic found it to be a "delightful children's TV show [with] the ideal mix of magic and morals", and complimented the lightheartedness and comedy as well as the topics of magic, friendship, and girl power.

References

External links

2020s American children's comedy television series
2021 American television series debuts
American children's fantasy television series
English-language Netflix original programming
Netflix children's programming
Television series about cats
Television series about children
Television series about witchcraft